Tervola Radio and TV-Mast is a mast in Tervola, Finland. It has a height of 302 metres (991 feet).

See also
List of tallest structures in Finland

Notes

Communication towers in Finland
Radio masts and towers in Europe
Transmitter sites in Finland